Danieltown is an unincorporated community in Brunswick County, in the U.S. state of Virginia.

References

Unincorporated communities in Brunswick County, Virginia